Sheytanabad may refer to:
 Eslamabad, Urmia
 Rahimabad, Urmia